Sepak takraw was contested at the 2002 Asian Games in Busan, South Korea by both men and women, with all games taking place at Dongseo University Minseok Sports Center.

Schedule

Medalists

Men

Women

Medal table

Participating nations
A total of 153 athletes from 10 nations competed in sepak takraw at the 2002 Asian Games:

References

2002 Asian Games Official Report, Pages 588–593

External links
 2002 Asian Games website

 
2002 Asian Games events
2002